Sir Thomas Clifton Webb  (8 March 1889 – 6 February 1962) was a New Zealand politician and diplomat.

Early life
He was born in Te Kōpuru, near Dargaville, in 1889. Thomas Webb was his father. He received his education at Te Kōpuru School, Auckland Grammar School, and the studied at Auckland University College. He practised law in Dargaville. He was in the army from 1917 to 1919, then returned to his practice in Dargaville and was a borough councillor there from 1921 to 1923. He moved to Auckland in 1927 and established a new law firm there.

Member of Parliament

A key aide to party leader Sidney Holland, he was appointed to Attorney-General upon National gaining power in 1949. As Minister of Justice, he was responsible for drafting the legislation that resulted in the abolition of the Legislative Council.

In 1951, he took his first step into diplomacy by adding Minister for External Affairs and Minister of Island Territories to his other duties; portfolios which he held from 1951 to 1954. In 1953, he was awarded the Queen Elizabeth II Coronation Medal. In 1955, Webb was granted the use of the title of "Honourable" for life, having served more than three years as a member of the Executive Council. He served as the country's High Commissioner to the United Kingdom between 1955 and 1958, and was appointed a Knight Commander of the Order of St Michael and St George in the 1956 New Year Honours.

Family
On 1 September 1915, Webb married Lucy Nairn in Auckland; they were to have two daughters. He died on 6 February 1962 in Wellington. His wife died in 1983.

References

External links
Biography in 1966 Encyclopaedia of New Zealand

|-

|-

1889 births
1962 deaths
Attorneys-General of New Zealand
Independent MPs of New Zealand
New Zealand Knights Commander of the Order of St Michael and St George
New Zealand foreign ministers
20th-century New Zealand lawyers
New Zealand National Party MPs
University of Auckland alumni
People educated at Auckland Grammar School
High Commissioners of New Zealand to the United Kingdom
New Zealand King's Counsel
People from Te Kōpuru
Members of the New Zealand House of Representatives
New Zealand MPs for North Island electorates
New Zealand politicians awarded knighthoods
Justice ministers of New Zealand